The Carnival Man is a 1929 American sound short drama film, directed by George Abbott and starring Walter Huston.

The film is fifteen minutes long and it is the first-ever film appearance of Huston, the father of actor and director John Huston and grandfather of actress Anjelica Huston.  The female lead was Ninetta (Nan) Sunderland, who would marry her Walter Huston in 1931. It was filmed Paramount Studios and Kaufman Astoria Studios, both in New York City.

It is unknown whether the film survives.

Cast
 Walter Huston
 Ninetta Sunderland (credited as Nan Sunderland)

See also
 1929 in film
 List of American films of 1929

References

External links
 

1929 drama films
1929 short films
1929 films
American drama short films
American black-and-white films
1920s English-language films
Films directed by George Abbott
Paramount Pictures short films
1920s American films